Lindarängen is a location outside Stockholm, Sweden. During the 1912 Summer Olympics, it hosted the steeplechase 

trials for the equestrian eventing competition. 

Between 1921 and 1952 Lindarängen also hosted Stockholm's water airport for seaplanes.

References

Venues of the 1912 Summer Olympics
Olympic equestrian venues
Sports venues in Stockholm
Airports in Sweden